Canadian singer-songwriter Kalan Porter has released two studio albums, six singles, and five music videos. Porter rose to prominence after winning the second season of Canadian Idol in 2004. His coronation single, "Awake in a Dream", spent eight weeks atop the Canadian Singles Chart and set the record for the best-selling debut single for a Canadian artist. Both of Porter's albums reached the top ten of the Canadian Albums Chart.

Albums

Studio albums

Singles

Music videos

References

External links
Kalan Porter

Discographies of Canadian artists

nl:Kalan Porter